Eremo della Madonna di Coccia (Italian for Hermitage of Madonna di Coccia) is an hermitage located in Campo di Giove, Province of L'Aquila (Abruzzo, Italy).

History

Architecture

References

External links 
 

Madonna di Coccia
Campo di Giove